The University Press of Kentucky (UPK) is the scholarly publisher for the Commonwealth of Kentucky, and was organized in 1969 as successor to the University of Kentucky Press. The university had sponsored scholarly publication since 1943. In 1949, the press was established as a separate academic agency under the university president, and the following year Bruce F. Denbo, then of Louisiana State University Press, was appointed as the first full-time professional director. Denbo served as director of UPK until his retirement in 1978, building a small but distinguished list of scholarly books with emphasis on American history and literary criticism.

Since its reorganization, the Press has represented a consortium that now includes all of Kentucky's state universities, seven of its private colleges, and two historical societies. UPK joined the Association of University Presses in 1947.

The press is supported by the Thomas D. Clark Foundation, a private nonprofit foundation established in 1994 for the sole purpose of providing financial support for The University Press of Kentucky. It is named in honor of Thomas D. Clark, Kentucky's historian laureate and the founder of The University Press of Kentucky.

Consortium members

Each constituent institution is represented on a statewide editorial board, which determines editorial policy.

Offices
Offices for the Administrative, Editorial, Production, and Marketing departments are found at the University of Kentucky, which is responsible for the overhead cost of the publishing operation. In 2012, UPK was moved under the aegis of the University of Kentucky Libraries, headed by Dean Terry Birdwhistell.

Bruce F. Denbo, UPK's first director, was succeeded by Kenneth H. Cherry, who came to UPK from the University of Tennessee Press. During his tenure, the size of the press more than quadrupled. Ken Cherry retired in the Fall of 2001, and his successor, Stephen Wrinn, formerly of Rowman & Littlefield Publishers, began as new director in April 2002. In August 2016, Leila Salisbury took over as director of the Press. Salisbury, who began her career at UPK, had served as director of the University Press of Mississippi since 2008. In 2020, Ashley Runyon, former director of trade publications at Indiana University Press, was named director.

UPK's editorial program focuses on the humanities and the social sciences. Its commitment to film and military studies has earned it a national reputation in recent years. Since the formation of the consortium, the press has broadened its appeal to readers in Kentucky and Appalachia with publications of special regional interest. During the 1970s it produced the Kentucky Nature Series and the 47-volume Kentucky Bicentennial Bookshelf.

The press publishes classic novels by Kentucky authors including Harriet Arnow, Janice Holt Giles, John Fox, Jr., James Still, and Jesse Stuart.

See also

 List of English-language book publishing companies
 List of university presses

References

External links
 

Kentucky
Publishing companies established in 1949
Publishing companies established in 1969
1949 establishments in Kentucky
1969 establishments in Kentucky
Publishing companies based in Kentucky